L'allegria (Joy/Happiness or better, Merriness) is a collection of poems published by Giuseppe Ungaretti in 1931. It was an expanded version of a 1919 collection Allegria di naufragi (Merriness of Shipwrecks). Many of the poems were written in reaction to Ungaretti's experience as a soldier of World War I.

Poems from L'allegria have been translated by Charles Tomlinson.

References

Further reading
 Hand, Vivienne, 'Ambiguous Joy: contradictions and tensions in Giuseppe Ungaretti's L'allegria', The Italianist, 16, p. 76-116
 Suvini-Hand, Vivienne, Mirage and Camouflage - Hiding behind Hermeticism in Ungaretti's L'Allegria, Troubadour, 2000

1931 poetry books
Italian poetry collections